Mohlaroyim (1792–1842), most commonly known by her pen name Nodira, was an Uzbek poet and stateswoman.  She functioned as regent of the Khanate of Kokand during the minority of her son from 1822. 

Nodira is generally regarded as one of the most outstanding Uzbek poets. She wrote poetry in Uzbek and Persian.  Nodira also used other pennames, such as Komila and Maknuna.  Many of her diwans have survived and consist of more than 10,000 lines of poetry.

Biography 
Nodira was the wife of Muhammad Umar Khan who ruled the Khanate of Kokand from c. 1810 until his death in 1822. Following her husband's death, Nodira became the de facto ruler of Kokand since her son Muhammad Ali Khan was only a teenager when he was crowned Khan; she continued to be a regent and advisor to him throughout his reign. She was also poetess who knew  Persian and Uzbek and would write her poetry both in Uzbek and Persian. Her work consisted of 10,000 hemistiches.

Despite her attempts to instill somewhat more socially liberal values into her son, Madali grew to employ expansionist policies that lead to a war with the rival Emirate of Bukhara. Her poetry was frowned upon by the ulama and was deemed "inappropriate", with her writing often bringing up taboo topics and bemoaning the suffering women faced in Central Asia in that time period.

She was hanged on the order of Emir Nasrullah Khan of Bukhara in April 1842 along with her sons during the Kokand-Bukhara wars. It was reported Nasrullah was furious that she refused to marry him.

Legacy 
Long after her  death in 1842 Nodira was promoted in the Soviet era as a national heroine of the Uzbek SSR and enjoyed a status similar to other murdered women such as Nurkhon Yuldasheva. In the public eye she is a martyr and national heroine, and 200 years after her birth, the first national postage stamp of newly independent Uzbekistan featured her portrait.

References 

1792 births
1842 deaths
19th-century women rulers
19th-century Uzbekistani poets
19th-century women writers
Uzbeks
People from Andijan
Persian-language poets
Uzbekistani women poets
19th-century Uzbekistani women
19th-century Uzbekistani people